The Hindu Temple of Greater Chicago (HTGC) is a Hindu temple complex in Lemont, Illinois. It was inaugurated and opened to the public in 1986. It includes a Rama temple and a temple dedicated to Ganesha, Shiva, and Durga.

History
In 1977, a group of South Indian community leaders formed the Hindu Temple of Greater Chicago organization. They chose Rama as the main deity of their future temple due to his wide appeal among Hindu immigrants. After considering around thirty sites in the Chicago metropolitan area, the organization bought eighteen acres of undeveloped bluff land near Lemont, a southwestern suburb. Accessibility, seclusion, and cost were the deciding factors.

To finance the temple's construction, the organization conducted fundraising activities and secured loans. In 1982-83, it started holding its rituals and gatherings in a home and in rented halls in suburban Downers Grove and Romeoville on a temporary basis. 

In 1983-84, frustrated by slow progress toward temple construction, a group of Telugu professionals left the organization to build their own Venkateswara temple in west suburban Aurora. Commenting on the split, scholar Padma Rangaswamy wrote, "The history of temple building in Chicago is also the story of bitter infighting among rival groups." Author Raymond Williams remarked, "The difficulties encountered in developing the plans and in raising the funds for the temple indicate how hard it is to unite people from the various regions and sects in support of one project." 

After the split, the organization continued with its plans. The foundation stone of the Rama temple was laid in June 1984. After two years of construction, the temple was inaugurated with a kumbhabhishekham on July 4, 1986.

In 1994, the original building on the site was converted to a temple dedicated to Ganesha, Shiva, and Durga. A kumbhabhishekham was performed for the temple in the summer of 1994.

Temple complex

It consists of four buildings, the Rama temple, Ganesha-Shiva-Durga temple a community center connecting the two temples and Vivekananda Spiritual Center. The Rama Temple includes sacred images of Rama, Sita, Lakshmana, Ganesha, Hanuman, Venkateshwara (Balaji), Mahalakshmi, Krishna, and Radha. The Ganesha-Shiva-Durga Temple includes sacred images of Shiva, Ganesha, Durga Devi, Subrahmanya, Parvathi, Nataraja, Ayappasamy, and Navagraha. The complex also includes The Swami Vivekananda Spiritual Center, which houses many of the spiritual activities organized by the temple. Sitting on "Vivekananda Hill", next to the Spiritual Center is a 10-foot statue made of bronze of Swami Vivekananda. The design of the statue was inspired by a photograph taken of Swami Vivekananda in Chicago after the World's Parliament of Religions in 1893.

References

External links
 The Hindu Temple of Greater Chicago Homepage

Hindu temples in Illinois
Religious buildings and structures in Cook County, Illinois
Tourist attractions in Cook County, Illinois
1986 establishments in Illinois
Buildings and structures in Cook County, Illinois